The 1999–2000 season was the 61st season in the existence of CD Toledo and the club's seventh consecutive season in the second division of Spanish football.

Pre-season and friendlies

Competitions

Overall record

Segunda División

League table

Results summary

Results by round

Matches

Source:

Copa del Rey

First round

References

CD Toledo
Toledo